The Inkisi River is the last (closest to the rivermouth) of the larger tributaries of the great Congo River, being the first south bank (left side) tributary, located in Western Central Africa.

The township of Zongo is situated close to the confluence with the Congo River, where there is a hydro power plant and a bridge.

References

Rivers of the Democratic Republic of the Congo